In probability theory, the craps principle is a theorem about event probabilities under repeated iid trials. Let  and  denote two mutually exclusive events which might occur on a given trial. Then the probability that  occurs before  equals the conditional probability that  occurs given that  or  occur on the next trial, which is

The events  and  need not be collectively exhaustive (if they are, the result is trivial).

Proof
Let  be the event that  occurs before . Let  be the event that neither  nor  occurs on a given trial.

Since the trials are i.i.d., we have . Using  and solving the displayed equation for  gives the formula 
.

Application

If the trials are repetitions of a game between two players, and the events are

then the craps principle gives the respective conditional probabilities of each player winning a certain repetition, given that someone wins (i.e., given that a draw does not occur).

Stopping
If the game is played repeatedly until someone wins, then the conditional probability above is the probability that the player wins the game. This is illustrated below for the original game of craps, using an alternative proof.

Craps example
If the game being played is craps, then this principle can greatly simplify the computation of the probability of winning in a certain scenario. Specifically, if the first roll is a 4, 5, 6, 8, 9, or 10, then the dice are repeatedly re-rolled until one of two events occurs:

For example, if the original roll was a 4, then the probability of winning is

This avoids having to sum the infinite series corresponding to all the possible outcomes:

Mathematically, we can express the probability of rolling  ties followed by rolling the point:

The summation becomes an infinite geometric series:

which agrees with the earlier result.

References

Notes

Theorems in statistics
Probability theorems
Statistical principles